Eastville is the name of both a council ward in the city of Bristol in the United Kingdom and a suburb of the city that lies within that ward. The Eastville ward covers the areas of Eastville, Crofts End (also known as Clay Hill), Stapleton and part of Fishponds. Notable places within the ward include Bristol Metropolitan Academy ( formerly Whitefield Fishponds Community School) and Colston's School, and the Bristol and Bath Railway Path also passes through the ward.

Eastville 

Eastville is an inner-suburb of the English city of Bristol, situated between Easton and Frome Vale wards in the north-east of the city. In the north-west its boundary is the M32 motorway, which roughly follows the River Frome.

Eastville Stadium (on the west bank of the Frome) used to be the home of Bristol Rovers Football Club, as well as being a site for greyhound racing and speedway, but this site has now been developed by IKEA.

Eastville Park is a large park with a small lake, just to the east of the M32.
The lake at Eastville Park was instigated as part of a social scheme by Ernest Bevin (a well-respected westcountryman), who later became Minister of Labour under Churchill in the coalition government of WW2 and later Foreign Secretary in the Attlee Government from 1945 until his death.

A large railway viaduct known as 'The Thirteen Arches' for obvious reasons, once ran through the area, roughly parallel to the current Muller Road; it was demolished in 1968. This was part of the Clifton Extension Railway.

The Eastville Workhouse, originally the Barton Regis Union Workhouse, was a former French Prison which was bought from the Government circa 1832. In 1930, the Stapleton Workhouse, originally the Bristol Union Workhouse, became the Stapleton Institution and by the Second World War the site was mainly used for the care of the mentally ill and the elderly; eventually becoming Blackberry Hill Hospital.

Crofts End 
Crofts End (also known as Clay Hill) is a suburb of Bristol. It is an industrialised area, with many small Victorian houses, built when this area was a coal mining community.

Churches 
Crofts End Church was established in 1895 by George Brown, as a Christian work for miner's children in The Freestone Rank, Whitehall Road, it became known as The Miner's Mission. It is now part of the local and much wider community but still very much a family church. The pastor is Andrew Yelland.

The church was built on a site bounded by market gardens, a brick works and Deep Pit Colliery. When The Beaufort Arms, then known as The Beatem and Wackem and now called The Wackum Inn was the place where most miners spent their hard earned wages! Hence the need for a children's work in that community.

Another local church was Clay Hill Chapel which was demolished when the industrial estates were built.

Industry 
Over many years, the Market Gardens became housing, White's Brick Works became Somers Wood Yard (now an industrial pallet site) – and Deep Pit Colliery became industrial estates. When Deep Pit closed, men were having to walk underground as far as Frenchay to reach the coal face.

Housing 
Crofts End House, located at the junction of Plummer's Hill and Whitehall Avenue, still exists, but no longer as a single dwelling. It has been refurbished and is now part of a housing association development.

The area is undergoing more change as the majority of 'prefabs' (built by American Service-men as post war housing) in the locality have been demolished. Planning applications will replace these with mixed style housing.

The old, redundant Civil Defence building on the junction of Crofts End Road and Brook Road was demolished and housing association flats were built on the site, now named "Craftes Court".

Fishponds 

Fishponds is a predominantly residential area of Bristol that lies partially within the Eastville ward.

Stapleton 

Stapleton is a suburb of Bristol which lies in the east of the city.

Residents 

 Andrew Beer (1862-1954), artist and racing pigeon expert
 Paul Potts, tenor, councillor for the ward from 1996 until 2003

References 

Areas of Bristol
Wards of Bristol